Solange Knowles, known mononymously as Solange, is an American singer, songwriter, model and actress. In 2008, she won an ASCAP Rhythm & Soul Award for Top R&B/Hip-Hop Song for her older sister Beyoncé's song "Get Me Bodied" (2006) which she co-wrote alongside Beyoncé, Kasseem "Swizz Beatz" Dean, Sean Garrett, Makeba Riddick and Angela Beyincé. Her third studio album A Seat at the Table (2016) received numerous nominations for various awards, and won Solange her first Grammy Award, for Best R&B Performance for "Cranes in the Sky", which was her first Grammy Award nomination. It also won Solange a Soul Train Music Award, a BET Award, a Webby Award and an Edison Jazz-World Award. In 2017, Solange won Billboard Women in Music Impact Award, being the first winner in the category. The same year, she was one of the winners of Glamour Award for Woman of the Year, alongside Nicole Kidman, Gigi Hadid, Maxine Waters, Samantha Bee,
Patty Jenkins, Peggy Whitson, Maria Grazia Chiuri, Muzoon Almellehan and the organizers of 2017 Women's March.

AMFT Awards 

!Ref.
|-
!scope="row"| 2016
| "Don't Touch My Hair"
| Best R&B Song
| 
|

Antville Music Video Awards

ASCAP Rhythm & Soul Awards

BET Awards

Billboard Women in Music

Black Girls Rock!

Brit Awards

Clio Awards

Shorty Awards

Soul Train Lady of Soul Awards

Soul Train Music Awards

UK Music Video Awards

Urban Music Awards

Webby Awards

Notes

References

External links
 Official website

Knowles, Solange